St Saviour's Church, Foremark is a Grade I listed parish church in the Church of England in Foremark, Derbyshire.

History

The church dates from 1662 and was built by Sir Francis Burdett, 2nd Baronet. The oak lectern was given in 1920 as a memorial to all those who fell in the First World War.

Parish status
The church is in a joint parish with:
St Mary the Virgin's Church, Newton Solney
St. Wystan's Church, Repton

See also
Grade I listed buildings in Derbyshire
Grade I listed churches in Derbyshire
Listed buildings in Foremark

References

Church of England church buildings in Derbyshire
Grade I listed churches in Derbyshire
Religious buildings and structures completed in 1662
1662 establishments in England